Affirmation is the second and final studio album by Australian pop duo Savage Garden. The album was released on 9 November 1999 by Columbia Records. It won the 2000 ARIA Music Award for Highest Selling Album. Alongside this it was nominated for Best Group and Best Pop Release but lost.

Background
The band recorded their second studio album after they recorded "The Animal Song" for the soundtrack to the film The Other Sister. The majority of the album was written by Hayes in New York in September 1999 or slightly earlier that year. The exception was 'You Can Still Be Free', a much older song that dated back to at least 1995 - a demo recording appeared on their 1995 demo tape, then titled 'Free'. The track was written in tribute to a friend of the band who had committed suicide some years previously, and was revisited after said friends' family explained they loved the song and wanted to see it released on an album. Preceded by the second single "I Knew I Loved You", the album was released on 9 November 1999 to worldwide success. The album spawned a further five singles, one of which was exclusive to the Australian market ("Chained to You"), and one of which was exclusive to the British market ("The Best Thing").

Following the success of the Superstars and Cannonballs video album, the album was reissued in November 2000, containing a bonus live album, Declaration, featuring recordings from the concert at the Brisbane Entertainment Centre on 21 May 2000. Including sales of the re-issue, the album has sold more than 8 million copies worldwide, being certified platinum in a number of countries. It became the band's last studio album after Daniel decided to leave in 2001.

Similarly to Savage Garden, the album's track listing varied internationally. The Australian version of the album features a bonus remix of "The Animal Song", a CD-ROM featuring video footage and bonus material, and the uncut version of "Gunning Down Romance". The International version removes the remix, CD-ROM and features a cut version of "Gunning Down Romance", due to a manufacturing error where six seconds of music are cut between 4:36 and 4:42, causing the music to stop abruptly.

Track listing
 All songs written by Darren Hayes and Daniel Jones, and produced by Walter Afanasieff.

Credits

Savage Garden
Darren Hayes – vocals
Daniel Jones – additional mimed guitars; keyboards, synthesizers, drum and rhythm programming

Additional personnel
Walter Afanasieff – keyboards, synthesizers, drum and rhythm programming, acoustic piano on track 9
Greg Bieck – keyboards and programming
Michael Landau – electric guitars
Michael Thompson - electric guitars and lead baritone guitar on track 6
Dean Parks – acoustic guitars
Nathan East – bass
Steve Smith – drums
Strings arranged and conducted by Jeremy Lubbock; contractor – Jules Chaikin

Production
Arranged and produced by Savage Garden and Walter Afanasieff
Recorded and engineered by Jay Healy (vocals), Kent Matcke (basic tracking), David Frazer (guitars, strings on track 9), David Reitzas (guitars) and David Gleeson (drums, Fairlight, vocals and piano)
Assistant engineers – Brian Vibberts, Pete Krawiec, Tony Rambo, Dave Ashton, Ethan Schofer, Dave Ashton, Luis Quine, Mark Gregory, Ryan Hewitt
Mixed by Dave Way (tracks 1–6 and 8–12) and Chris Lord-Alge (track 7)
Mastered by Vlado Meller

Affirmation World Tour
The band and crew for the Affirmation World Tour were:

Band
Karl Lewis – drums
Lee Novak – bass
Ben Carey – guitar
Jennifer Blakeman – keyboard
Elisa Fiorillo – backing vocals
Angi Bekker – backing vocals

Crew
Peter McFee – tour manager
Susie Steadman – assistant tour manager
Colin Skals – stage manager
Colin Ellis – front of house engineer
Bruce Ramus – lighting director
Scott Pike – monitor engineer
Lindsay McKay – guitar technician
Adrian Dessent – guitar technician
Simon Moran – drum technician
Sean "Motley" Hackett – lighting operator
Nina De Palma – wardrobe stylist

Charts and certifications

Weekly charts

Year-end charts

Decade-end charts

Certifications and sales

References

1999 albums
Savage Garden albums
Albums produced by Walter Afanasieff
ARIA Award-winning albums
Columbia Records albums